Andolan is a 1995 Bollywood action film directed by Aziz Sejawal and produced by Sajid Nadiadwala. It stars Sanjay Dutt, Govinda, Mamta Kulkarni, Somy Ali in lead roles. Actress Divya Bharti was the first choice to play Guddi in this film. Upon her death, the role was later portrayed by Mamta Kulkarni. This film marked veteran actress Asha Parekh's final role before retirement.

Cast

 Sanjay Dutt as Adarsh 
 Govinda as Aniket
 Mamta Kulkarni as Guddi
 Somy Ali as Anita
 Asha Parekh as Bharti 
 Dalip Tahil as Sabra
 Mohan Joshi as Dalvi
 Rami Reddy as Baba Nayak
 Ishrat Ali as Azaad Deshpande
 Deepak Shirke as Inspector
 Vikram Gokhale as Pradhan
 Madan Jain as Inspector Subhash
 Vinay Sapru as Ashraf
 Ghanashyam Nayak as College Professor
 Achyut Potdar as Interviewer
 Kamaldeep as Saxena

Soundtrack

The music of the film is composed Duo Nadeem-Shravan & Lyrics penned By ''Sameer. The soundtrack was released with 1995 Tips Cassettes & Records by which consists of 7 songs. The full album is recorded by Sudesh Bhosle , Kumar Sanu, Udit Narayan, Alka Yagnik, Bali Brahmabhatt. A second rendition of the song, Mazar Karle Meri Jaan, sung by Bali Brahmbhatt & Sapna Mukerjee is picturised in film but not released on the soundtrack.

References

External links
 

1995 films
1990s Hindi-language films
Films scored by Nadeem–Shravan
Films directed by Aziz Sejawal
Indian action comedy films
Hindi-language action films
1995 action comedy films